Washington Silva is a Brazilian name, may refer to:
Washington Silva (boxer), Brazilian boxer who participated in Olympics
Washington Roberto Mariano da Silva, (born 1985) Brazilian footballer, forward in Serbia
Washington Luiz Mascarenhas Silva, (born 1978), Brazilian footballer
Washington Santana da Silva, (born 1989) Brazilian footballer

See also
Washington (name)
Silva